The following is a list of notable people associated with Texas A&M University–Commerce, located in the American city of Commerce, Texas.

Notable alumni

Politics and government
 Randy Alexander – Republican member of the Arkansas House of Representatives from Springdale, Arkansas
 Parimal V Tergundi - Professor at KLS Gogte Institute of Technology, Belagavi
 Mike Conaway – Republican member of the United States House of Representatives from Texas's 11th congressional district
 Marsha Farney (formerly Marsha Gonyaw) – Republican member of the Texas House of Representatives from Williamson County; received bachelor's and master's degrees in professional education from the Commerce campus in the early 1990s
 Jimmy Hickey Jr. – Republican member of the Arkansas State Senate from Texarkana, Arkansas; obtained Bachelor of Business Administration from the Texarkana campus
 Alphonso Jackson – former secretary of Housing and Urban Development under U.S. President George W. Bush
 Tom Price – judge of the Texas Court of Criminal Appeals, 1997-2015
 Sam Rayburn – Democratic representative for Texas's 4th congressional district and long-term Speaker of the United States House of Representatives
 Gary VanDeaver – former school superintendent for the New Boston Independent School District and incoming Republican member of the Texas House of Representatives; received doctorate in education from TAMU-Commerce
 Mary Lou Bruner – Republican candidate for a seat on the Texas State Board of Education; received a master's degree in Special Ed. from the Commerce campus (when it was called East Texas State University).
 Jacob Walls - President of Frisco West WCIDDC; received a master's degree in Accountancy

Media and arts

 Duane Allen – lead singer of The Oak Ridge Boys
 Tia Ballard – actress for Funimation Entertainment
 Rob Collins - Emmy Winning Sports Anchor at FOX4 TV Kansas City. 
 Will Creedle – Novelist and thought leader in the field of website ADA compliance
 Jim Fiscus – photographer specializing in editorial and advertising photography, including several campaigns for the Showtime series Dexter
 Trenton Doyle Hancock – fine artist
 Colleen Hoover – New York Times bestselling author of eleven novels and five novellas
 Donovan Lewis - Sports Talk Radio Host at SportsRadio 1310 The Ticket, Dallas, TX
 Staley T. McBrayer – newspaper publisher and inventor of the Vanguard web offset press for newspaper printing
 John Charles Norman – advertising executive and graphic designer, Chief Creative Officer, TBWA Chiat Day, Los Angeles
 Bill O'Neal – author who has written more than thirty books and three hundred articles and book reviews on the American West
 Robyn O'Neil – artist known for her large-scale graphite on paper drawings
 Gary Panter – illustrator and set designer of Pee Wee's Playhouse
 Freda Ross - News Director at WBAP-AM, Dallas, TX
 Michael Sampson – New York Times best-selling author
Michael Schwab (designer) – Graphic designer and illustrator, attended from 1970 until 1972.
 Mark Seliger – photographer noted for his portraiture; regular front-page photographer for Rolling Stone, where he began working in 1987.
 Jordan Randall Smith - founder and music director of Symphony Number One
 Renée Witterstaetter – comic book colorist, editor, and writer

Athletes and coaches
 Autry Beamon – former NFL player
 Bobby Bounds – former Arena League Football player
 Chad Brown – NFL official, refereed Super Bowls XXXV and XLV
 Marv Brown – former Detroit Lion
 Curtis Buckley – former NFL player
 John Carlos – former sprinter; professional football player; human rights activist 
 Tim Collier – former NFL cornerback
 Danny Mason – current CFL Defensive End for the Ottawa RedBlacks
 Ricky Collins – current CFL wide receiver for the BC Lions
 Derrick Crawford – former Arena Football League player
 Will Cureton - former starting quarterback for the Cleveland Browns
 Clint Dolezel – former Arena Football League all-star quarterback; head coach for the Philadelphia Soul in the AFL
 Jon Gilliam – former Kansas City Chiefs player, played in Super Bowl I
 Rich Houston – American football player
 Bo Kelly – former Arena League Football player for the Arizona Rattlers
 Kader Kohou - Ivorian NFL cornerback for the Miami Dolphins
 Dee Mackey – former NFL player for the San Francisco 49ers
 Kyle Mackey – Former NFL Quarterback for the New York Jets and Miami Dolphins
 Harvey Martin – former defensive end in the National Football League and Super Bowl XII MVP
 Kevin Mathis –  former starting cornerback for the Super Bowl Champion Dallas Cowboys
 Mike Miller – former head coach of the Eastern Illinois Panthers men's basketball team
 Rex Norris – former defensive coordinator at the University of Oklahoma
 Luis Perez – Quarterback for the Birmingham Iron of the AAF
 Bryn Roy - professional Canadian football player
 Wes Smith – former NFL player for the Green Bay Packers
 Aundra Thompson – former NFL player for the Green Bay Packers
 Michael Trigg – former ArenaBowl-winning player and head coach
 Darrell Tully – former NFL player; Superintendent of schools at Spring Branch ISD in the Houston area
 Alan Veingrad – NFL football player
 Devondrick Walker – Professional European basketball player
 Sam Walton – NFL football player
 Curtis Wester – former Canadian Football League player
 Dwight White – Hall of Fame NFL player for the Pittsburgh Steelers, Super Bowl Champion
Darrell Williams (born 1989), basketball player for Hapoel Tel Aviv of the Israeli Premier League
 Antonio Wilson – former professional football player for the Minnesota Vikings and the Edmonton Eskimos of the Canadian Football League
 Wade Wilson - former NFL quarterback

Military personnel
 Chris Adams – United States Air Force officer and author

See also

 List of people from Texas
 Texas A&M University-Commerce

References

External links
 Texas A&M University-Commerce Alumni Association

Texas AandM University-Commerce people